José Leroy (born 4 August 1957) is a French boxer. He competed in the men's light flyweight event at the 1976 Summer Olympics.

References

1957 births
Living people
French male boxers
Olympic boxers of France
Boxers at the 1976 Summer Olympics
Place of birth missing (living people)
Light-flyweight boxers